The Nationalist Party (Kómma Ethnikofrónōn; literally National Opinion Party) was a conservative and irredentist Greek political party from 1865 to 1909. It was opposed primarily by the New Party of Charilaos Trikoupis.

History
The Nationalist Party was formed after the previous major-power client political parties, the Russian Party, English Party and the French Party, ceased to be factors after the reign of King Otto in 1865. The first leader of the Nationalist Party was Alexandros Koumoundouros, who was a ten-time Prime Minister of Greece. Koumoundouros was able to draw many of the conservative stalwarts of the old Russian Party with some of the other two parties to develop a coherent, albeit mostly personality-driven, party of the right. Koumoundouros was succeeded as party leader and Prime Minister by Theodoros Deligiannis, who famously stated that he "was against everything Trikoupis was for". By stoking the fires of nationalism and territorial expansion, Deligiannis was able to take advantage of military events and economic downturns to propel himself to power.

Throughout the 1880s and 1890s, Greece developed a stable two-party system with the premiership alternating between Deligiannis and Trikoupis. Deligiannis was assassinated in 1905 by a gambler who was outraged at Deligiannis's proposal to curtail gambling. With Deligiannis's death, the Nationalist Party began to splinter. Many of the conservative leaders followed Dimitrios Gounaris' so-called "Japanese Group", and later formed the People's Party.

Leaders
 Alexandros Koumoundouros (1865–1882)
 Theodoros Deligiannis (1882–1905)

References

Political parties established in 1865
Political parties disestablished in 1912
Defunct nationalist parties in Greece
Nationalist Party
Eastern Orthodox political parties
1865 establishments in Greece
1913 disestablishments in Greece